Miksike MentalMath is a project for students to improve their mental calculation skill. The project consists of online JavaScript-based mental training and competing platform and competitions that are held on national and international levels. The project was developed by Kalev Põldsaar of Estonia.

Participation 
The project is held in five countries: Estonia, Latvia, Lithuania, Ukraine and Slovenia. Students from each must register to website pointing their schools to be able to take a part in competitions. The age groups are primary 1–3 grade(form), basic 4–6, boys 7–12, girls 7–12, boys 13 and over, girls 13 and over.

Tasks 
Training consists of various tasks: addition, subtraction, multiplication, division, mixed tasks, gap-filling and comparison. Almost every task has three parts: natural numbers, integers, ratios (since 2010). More complex tasks are grouped into triathlons and pentathlons. The pentathlon consists of five tasks and 45 minutes are allowed to calculate them. Pentathlon is used at international championships.

At every task (addition, subtraction and so on) it is given 40 seconds every six levels at normal mode. Sprint mode covers 190 seconds for the student to answer five examples in a row correctly to level up. Higher levels are more difficult to solve, but they give many more points.

International competitions 
An international competition of Miksike MentalMath is held every year at the end of spring. Each year there compete more than one hundred students. The competition is held in a different country each year.

See also 
 Mental calculation
 Mental calculator
 Mental Calculation World Cup

References

External links 
 Miksike MentalMath (English website)
 Miksike MentalMath (Estonian website)
 Youtube: example of calculating at International championship, 2007
 Table of best recorded results (pentathlon)

Mathematics competitions
Information technology in Estonia